Illimar Pärn (born October 27, 1988) is an Estonian ski jumper. Pärn made his individual World Cup debut in Kuopio 2010. In 2005 he was a part of the Estonian World Cup team in Lahti.

References 

1988 births
Living people
Sportspeople from Tartu
Estonian male ski jumpers